Poliellina is an extinct genus from a well-known class of fossil marine arthropods, the trilobites. This faunal stage was part of the Cambrian Period.

References

Corynexochida genera
Dolichometopidae
Cambrian trilobites
Cambrian trilobites of Europe
Cambrian trilobites of Asia